Roy Nicolas Samaha   (born 12 September 1984 in Zahlé) is a retired (from the 1st division) Lebanese professional basketball player. He was a key player in the Lebanon national basketball team and participated lately in the 2006 FIBA World Championship,FIBA Asia Championship 2007 and FIBA World Olympic Qualifying Tournament for Men 2008.

Early years
Samaha started his basketball career in 2000 when he was recruited by Sagesse, one of the leading basketball teams in Lebanon. He joined Sagesse and made his way to the first team in the end of 1999.

Professional sports career

Sagesse (Hekmeh) Years (1999-2004)
Samaha played with Hekmeh BC (Sagesse) team for 4 consecutive seasons where he helped his team win four Lebanese Basketball League championships, three Lebanese Cups and for the first time in Lebanon's history, two FIBA Asia Champions Cup titles in 2000 and 2004.

Blue Stars Years (2005-2007)
Samaha transferred to the Blue Stars team for three consecutive seasons. He played as a starter.

Mouttahed (2007-2009)
Following his time with the Blue Stars, Samaha joined the newly promoted to Division A Al Mouttahed Tripoli team. Samaha averaged 10 points and 10 rebounds a game and led his team to the semi-finals and caused an upset by beating his former team and one of the favorites to win the championship.. Al Mouttahed Tripoli lost in the finals to Sporting Al Riyadi Beirut, which had been unbeaten that season, 3 games to 1.

Sagesse (2009-2010)
After his injury, Samaha rejoined his former team the green castle Hekmeh BC (Sagesse). He finished with 11.5 points per game and about 10 rebounds per game.

Anibal Zahle (2010-2012) 
After a summer with the national team, Samaha joined his city club Anibal Zahle.  Anibal Zahle won the Dubai Championship 2011, and the club managed to grab second in the Lebanese Championship after defeating Riyadi.

Mouttahed (2012-2013)

Honors and awards
Lebanese Cup Winner -01, 02, 03
Lebanese League Champion -01, 02, 03, 04,15,17
Asian Club Championships -01, 04(winner), 07 (Quarterfinals)
Lebanese U18 National Team -01
West Asian championship (junior) 1st place -01
Lebanese National Team -02-08
World Championships  -02, 06
WABA Cup -04
Lebanese U20 National Team -04
Asian U20 Championships in Tehran (Iran) - 04
WABA Championships in Tehran -04
Lebanese Cup Semifinals -06
World Championships in Japan -06: 5 games: 4.6ppg, 3.8rpg
Asian Games in Doha -06
Lebanese League Finalist -07, 08
William Jones Cup Tournament -07
Asia-Basket.com All-Lebanese League Most Improved Player of the Year -08
Asia-Basket.com All-Lebanese League Honorable Mention -08

Personal
Samaha graduated from the Lebanese American University (Byblos) with high distinction.
Prior to joining Moutahed Tripoli in 2007, Samaha played in France with Paris Basket Racing.

References

1984 births
Living people
Centers (basketball)
Lebanese American University alumni
Lebanese men's basketball players
People from Zahle
Basketball players at the 2006 Asian Games
Power forwards (basketball)
2002 FIBA World Championship players
2006 FIBA World Championship players
Asian Games competitors for Lebanon
Sagesse SC basketball players
Al Riyadi Club Beirut basketball players